Roger Brown (December 10, 1941 – November 22, 1997) was an American artist and painter.  Often associated with the Chicago Imagist groups, he was internationally known for his distinctive painting style and shrewd social commentaries on politics, religion, and art.

Early life 
Roger Brown was born on December 10, 1941, and raised in Hamilton and Opelika, Alabama. He was described in his formative years as a creative child, an inclination his parents are said to have encouraged. Brown took art classes from second to ninth grade, and won first prize in a statewide poster competition in tenth grade.

After high school Brown left the South. Although he lived much of his adult life elsewhere, he maintained his connection to the region both in his artwork and research, and later with his plan to purchase the "Rock House" in Beulah, Alabama.

Influences 
During childhood Brown was close with his grandparents, especially his great-grandmother, Mammy. This experience instilled an early interest in his family's origins, later inspiring extensive research into his family's genealogy. This research was expressed artistically in a number of paintings that track family relationships, most notably "Autobiography in the Shape of Alabama (Mammyʼs Door)" and in references to Elvis Presley, who was a distant cousin.

His upbringing in the southern United States also led to a deep interest in the material culture of the South, especially in folk art and hand made, functional objects. From his adolescent and teen years he took influences from the aesthetics of comics, theatre, architecture and interiors and streamlined Art Deco and machine-age design. Additionally, the influence of his religious upbringing in the independent, fundamentalist Church of Christ was formative and lasting.

While attending the School of the Art Institute Chicago (SAIC) from 1962 to 1970, Brown was introduced to a range of art historical periods and genres, gravitating to Pre-Renaissance Italian art, Surrealism, American artists Edward Hopper, Grant Wood, and Georgia O'Keeffe, and the tribal art of many cultures.  Painter Ray Yoshida and art historian Whitney Halstead, both professors at SAIC, also greatly influenced Brown's practice.  Both included folk, popular, and self-taught art within the scope of their teaching, genres which Brown sustained enthusiastic interest in throughout his life. Other influences stemming from Brown's SAIC days include the legendary Maxwell Street market, antique and thrift stores, and amusement parks.

Travel was also a source for inspiration and subject matter throughout Brown's artistic career; experiences throughout the U.S.—where he took frequent road trips—and in Mexico, Europe, Russia, and Africa found expression in both his paintings and in his collections.

Brown became known as an astute and intuitive collector, a practice he began during childhood. His collections inspired much of his work throughout his thirty-odd year career. His Chicago collection is preserved, as he left it, at the Roger Brown Study Collection of the School of the Art Institute of Chicago. The RBSC archive contains materials from Brown's collections from homes in New Buffalo, Michigan, and La Conchita, California.

Collecting 
Collected art and objects functioned as important source materials for Brown's work and were an integral part of his practice and discipline. Collecting was a pursuit shared by many of his Chicago colleagues, and reflected a collecting sensibility in Chicago. Brown didn't claim to be a curator, but felt that objects would gravitate towards like objects, establishing visual and associative dialogues along the way.  Brown's collection includes the work of many of his friends and colleagues including Ray Yoshida, Karl Wirsum, Barbara Rossi, Jim Nutt, Don Baum, and Christina Ramberg, among others. Brown collected works by a vast array of self-taught artists including 36 works by Joseph Yoakum, a major work by Henry Darger, birdhouse cathedrals by Aldo Piacenza, hand painted text works by Jesse Howard, and many others.  Artworks and objects from outside America reflect Brown's travels and aesthetic interests.  These include Yoruba twin figures, Baule masks, Guerrero masks, Hopi katsina, molas, and many other objects from very diverse locations and traditions.

The display of these objects was influenced by Chicago Imagist artist Ray Yoshida's display technique, utilizing simple white shelves densely populated with wide-ranging objects. It is notable that Brown displayed all of the objects in his collection as holding equal value no matter their background or provenance. Today this democratic treatment of objects is continued at the RBSC, with each object treated as a museum artifact.

Education 
After graduating from high school in 1960 Brown attended David Lipscomb College in Nashville, Tennessee, where he briefly pursued his interest in entering the ministry. In the fall of 1962 Brown moved to Chicago, where he took classes at the American Academy of Art before enrolling at the School of the Art Institute of Chicago (SAIC). His first experience at SAIC was brief, and in 1963 he returned to the American Academy of Art, where he completed a commercial design program in 1964. He then returned to SAIC as a full-time student from 1965 to 1970, where he committed to a fine art focus that would lead to his prolific career over the next three decades. In 1968 Brown received his Bachelor of Fine Art and in 1970 he was awarded his Master of Fine Art, both from SAIC. With his MFA Brown also received Edward L. Ryerson Traveling Fellowship, which supported travels throughout Europe and Egypt, where he collected objects, images, and inspiration.

Early career 
Brown developed a mature visual vocabulary in the late 1960s, with visual themes including silhouetted figures, nocturnal cityscapes, and theatre facades and interiors.  Encouraged by Yoshida and Halsted, Brown and his colleagues began to look to the work of self-taught artists, visiting Joseph Yoakum, Aldo Piacenza, William Dawson, Lee Godie, and others. Brown became an ardent champion for the validity of such works as equal or superior to works from the mainstream. Exploring and documenting art environments and the vernacular landscape became an ongoing pursuit.

Mid-career 
Brown's first solo exhibit at Phyllis Kind Gallery (Chicago, 1971) began his 26-year representation at PKG in Chicago (beginning in 1970) and New York (beginning in 1975). Although affiliated with the Chicago Imagist school throughout his career, Brown's work evolved beyond the indeterminate definition of that "school."  In the early 1970s he received acclaim for his paintings of stylized landscapes and cityscapes as stark backdrops for aspects of contemporary life as well as the "Disasters" series (1972), paintings of exploding buildings, followed by a procession of iconic, flat-patterned landscapes.

Brown's critical acclaim grew in the 1970s and 1980s. He became known for responding to 20th-century life through works that addressed a range of subjects and issues: natural, architectural and urban landscapes, the dichotomy of nature and culture, disasters of all types, current and political events, social, religious, and popular culture, autobiographical, personal, and sexual issues, the art world in many guises, cosmology, mortality, history, mythology, transformation, transportation, and the weather.  He used the weather as an allegorical backdrop for the larger physical and metaphysical forces that dwarf the human endeavor.

In addition to painting and printmaking, Brown's mediums eventually included sculpture of found, assembled, and painted objects, theatre and opera sets, and mosaic murals. In 1979 he designed sets for the Chicago Opera Theatre's production of Mozart's "Cosi fan Tutte."

Chicago Imagists 
Early on, Brown, along with many of his colleagues, was recognized by curator Don Baum, who organized spirited "Chicago School" exhibitions at the Hyde Park Art Center from 1966 to 1971. Brown's work was shown there in the group exhibition "False Image" (1968, 69). From these early HPAC exhibitions, a loosely associated group of artists became known as Chicago Imagists, a term coined by art critic Franz Schulz (1972). They did not form a group, adopt the name, or have a shared ideology, but they did work independently of New York contemporary art trends and incorporated imagery from popular culture into their works, although less cerebrally than New York Pop artists.

Later career 
In the late 1980s Brown adapted his work and collecting disciplines to Southern California, moving into a home and studio (designed by Stanley Tigerman) in La Conchita, in 1993. Still addressing a broad range of subjects in his works, Brown created condensed, serial works that focused on California experiences, including a series of ominous cloud-scapes, paintings of rose trees and shrubs; a series of Virtual Still Life object paintings (27 paintings with projecting shelves holding ceramic objects); and metaphorical explorations of Bonsai, his final sequence.

In 1991 Brown created two Italian glass mosaic murals entitled "Arts and Sciences of the Ancient World: The Flight of Daedalus" and "Icarus and Arts and Sciences of the Modern World: La Salle Corridor with Holding Pattern".  These were installed on the façade and in the lobby of the Ahmanson Commercial Development Company, a subsidiary of Home Savings of America, at 120 North LaSalle St., Chicago. His second large scale mural was the "City of the Big Shoulders" commissioned by The Equitable for the NBC building at Cityfront Center, Chicago and located in the west lobby of the 455 North Columbus Building. His third (untitled) mosaic mural is a tribute to the African burial ground, discovered during the excavation for the Ted Weiss Federal Building at 290 Broadway, New York City, dedicated in 1995. In September 1997 the mosaic mural "Hull House, Cook County, Howard Brown: A Tradition of Helping", designed by Brown, was dedicated at the Howard Brown Health Center in Chicago.

Exhibitions 
Brown's exhibition history is extensive. He was represented by the Phyllis Kind Gallery in Chicago and New York, and his work was shown in numerous solo and group exhibitions in museums and galleries around the country and abroad. Major retrospectives of his work were mounted at the Montgomery Museum of Fine Arts in 1980, and at The Hirshhorn Museum and Sculpture Garden in 1987. In 2019, as a part of the Alabama 200 Celebration, The Jule Collins Smith Museum of Fine Art presented a survey of work by him and his brother, Greg Brown, in Creative Cadences. He is represented in many major museum collections including the Art Institute of Chicago, Museum of Contemporary Art (Chicago), Jule Collins Smith Museum of Fine Art at Auburn University, Metropolitan Museum of Art, Whitney Museum of American Art, Museum of Modern Art, Corcoran Gallery of Art, High Museum of Art, Milwaukee Art Museum, and the Scottish National Gallery of Modern Art.

Homes 
Brown owned homes, studios, and gardens in Chicago, Illinois; New Buffalo, Michigan; and La Conchita, California. He was in the process of developing his final home and studio in Beulah, Alabama, at the time of his death.  The School of the Art Institute Chicago became the primary repository for Brown's personal, professional, and artistic effects. SAIC operates his New Buffalo, MI retreat as a residency facility for SAIC faculty and staff. His Chicago collection was formalized into the Roger Brown Study Collection, a house museum, archive, and special collection in 1997.

Chicago 
In 1974 Brown purchased a storefront in Chicago at 1926 North Halsted Street, which became his first home, studio, and collection environment. This home is owned by the School of the Art Institute Chicago and is maintained as the Roger Brown Study Collection, a house museum and special collection, serving SAIC as an academic resource, and is open to the public by appointment.

Michigan 
Brown commissioned his partner, architect George Veronda, to design a home and studio for a Lake Michigan dunes property he purchased in New Buffalo, Michigan. The Veronda Pavilion, a residence, and the Roger Brown Studio and Guest House were completed in 1979. Throughout the 1980s Brown divided his time between Chicago and New Buffalo, where he assembled a second collection of art and objects, and developed a garden.

The pavilion and studio/guest house are steel and glass modernist structures tucked into a secluded dunes landscape between the Galien River and a beachfront road. Parallels can be drawn between Veronda's design these buildings and Mies van der Rohe's Farnsworth House (Plano, IL, 1950).  The Pavilion and Guest House contain furnishings designed by Veronda, as well as Brown's collection, including works by contemporary artists, tribal sculpture and textiles, works by folk and self-taught artists, and examples of Brown's own work.

Brown's Michigan home and studio provided him with a new source of inspiration not previously available to him in the city: nature and a continually changing landscape. Here is where Brown first began experimenting with landscape design, surrounding the buildings with a swath of native grasses and flowers, and later planting several hundred rose shrubs. He also installed sculptures including a large sheet metal cross, reproduction Roman busts, sundry architectural ornaments, sculptures by "Joe the Welder", and other objects.

In 1995 Brown gave his New Buffalo property to SAIC with the intention that it serve as a retreat for SAIC faculty and staff. The Studio, Pavilion and Guest House have been used since 1996 by SAIC faculty and full-time staff, who may apply for two-week residencies through the faculty enrichment and sabbatical programs.

In Spring 2007 SAIC's Historic Landscape Studio class (offered through SAIC's Historic Preservation graduate program), taught by Carol Yetken, undertook a project to research the landscape history of New Buffalo property, and create a preservation plan. The New Buffalo facility is used by SAIC faculty and staff year-round and is not open to the public.

California 
In the late 1980s Brown searched for a place to live on the west coast. He found property in the beach town of La Conchita, north of Ventura, with a Spartan "Royal Mansion" trailer.  In 1993 home and studio, designed by architect Stanley Tigerman, was completed. Though he originally planned to live in the trailer and build a studio alongside it, in the final plans the trailer served as a guest house.  The architecture for the main home studio structure, which he referred to as the "Temple of Painting," was conceived as part barn, part basilica, with a Romanesque clerestory, corrugated roof, and stucco painted a deep salmon-pink, inspired by the color of the La Purisima Mission in nearby Lompoc. An important feature of the La Conchita house—and one that was specifically stipulated by Brown in all of his homes—was the presence of a large expanse of white walls on which he could display his collection.

As with his other homes, Brown filled this house and garden with collected objects—well over 1,500 in total by the time he bequeathed the estate to SAIC—referred to in scholarly material as his La Conchita Collection. The breadth of objects included was comparable to his other collections, with everything from formal paintings to African objects to everyday objects. However the La Conchita collection can be seen to reflect his California environment, featuring an extensive array of nearly 500 ceramic objects featuring objects by amateurs, regional factory-made wares, and Mexican wares by families or studios. The contents and direction of this collection was guided both by Brown's own exploration of the environment and by the network of friends and colleagues he established in California, namely his friend Lisa Cathcart, director of Casa Dolores, Center for the Study of the Popular Arts of Mexico.

Brown bequeathed the La Conchita home and collection to SAIC in 1997. The house has since been sold, and much of the collection has been archived. Brown's Spartan trailer now resides at the Museum of Jurassic Technology in Culver City, California (along with a collection of similar mobile residences).   In addition to Brown's original furnishings and decor, the Spartan now also showcases a series of models depicting different views of the trailer made by artist, SAIC Associate Professor and RBSC Curator Nicholas Lowe.  Surrounding the trailer in its new location is a reconstruction of part of Brown's La Conchita garden.   Portions of Brown's La Conchita garden are also replicated at Casa Dolores.

Alabama 
In 1997 Brown was in the process of developing a fourth home/studio/collection environment in an 1870s stone house in Beulah, Alabama, with the vision of "coming full circle" and have his Alabama home. This house, known as the Rock House, was only 15 miles from his parents' home in Alabama.  Brown first documented the Rock House on super-8 film as a child.  Upon purchasing the Rock House as an adult, Brown sent all the furnishings––the beginnings of another collection––of rugs, quilts, and examples of his own work to his brother Greg Brown, for installation into the house.

Brown died on November 22, 1997. The project was completed by his parents and brother, and opened as the Roger Brown Rock House Museum in 1999.  The family added to Brown's collection of objects for the Alabama house after his death, contributing personal artifacts and family memorabilia.

Personal life 
Roger Brown was a gay man. In 1972 he met architect George Veronda (1941–1984) and the two formed a strong artistic and romantic relationship. Veronda was diagnosed with lung cancer in 1983 and died in 1984. Brown frequented venues like The Gold Coast, one of Chicago's first gay leather bars, and included elements of cruising culture in some of his paintings.

Brown was diagnosed as HIV positive in 1988 and by 1993 was living with AIDS. Themes related to the HIV/AIDS pandemic appeared in Brown's work in the 1980s and continued throughout the rest of his career although he never wished to be a "one note artist" and continued to draw subject matter from almost every aspect of 20th century American culture. Despite experiencing painful side effects from medications and periods of hospitalization, the final years of Brown's life were some of his most productive. Between 1993 and 1997, Brown completed more than eighty paintings, and planned and executed home, studio, and garden designs. One of Brown's final large scale projects was a mosaic for the Howard Brown Health Center, a Chicago organization that provides healthcare to LGBTQ individuals.

Roger Brown died on November 22, 1997, and was survived by his parents, James and Mary Elizabeth Brown and his brother Greg Brown. Brown was honored posthumously by the Chicago Commission on Human Relations' Advisory Council on Lesbian, Gay, Bisexual, and Transgender Issues and was inducted into the LGBT Hall of Fame in 2004. Brown's work was featured in the exhibitions Roger Brown: This Boy's Own Story, curated by Kate Pollasch, and a project of the Roger Brown Study Collection and Art AIDS America Chicago, a landmark exhibition which explored the way the AIDS crisis impacted art and culture.

Other 
In 2004 Roger Brown was inducted into the Chicago Gay and Lesbian Hall of Fame.

Public Collections
Akron Museum of Art, Akron, OH
The Art Institute of Chicago, Chicago, IL
Corcoran Gallery of Art, Washington, D.C.
Dallas Museum of Art, Dallas, TX
Hirshhorn Museum and Sculpture Garden, Washington, D.C.
Indianapolis Museum of Art, Indianapolis, IN
Jule Collins Smith Museum of Fine Art, Auburn, AL
Kalamazoo Institute of Arts, Kalamazoo, MI
Los Angeles County Museum of Art, Los Angeles, CA
Madison Museum of Contemporary Art, Madison, WI
Metropolitan Museum of Art, New York, NY
Milwaukee Art Museum, Milwaukee, WI
Montgomery Museum of Art, Montgomery, AL
Museum Boijmans Van Beuningen, Rotterdam, Netherlands
Museum of Fine Arts, Boston, MA
Museum of Modern Art, New York, NY
Smithsonian American Art Museum, Smithsonian Institution, Washington, D.C.
Nelson-Atkins Museum of Art, Kansas City, MO
North Carolina Museum of Art, Raleigh, NC
Scottish National Gallery, Edinburgh, Scotland
Whitney Museum, New York, NY
Lowe Art Museum, Coral Gables, Florida
Memphis Brooks Museum of Art, Memphis, TN

Solo exhibitions 
 2019 Roger Brown: Virtual Still Lifes, Museum of Arts and Design, New York, New York, May 2-September 15
 2014 Roger Brown: His American Icons, Hughes Gallery, Sydney, Australia, March 22 - April 14
 2013 Roger Brown, DC Moore Gallery, New York City, NY, January 8 - February 2
 2012 Roger Brown: This Boy’s Own Story, Sullivan Galleries, School of the Art Institute of Chicago, IL, August 24 – November 10
 2012 Dual exhibition, Roger Brown: Major Paintings, Russell Bowman Art Advisory, Chicago, IL and Zolla Lieberman Gallery, Chicago, IL, September 7 - October 27
 2010 Roger Brown: Calif. U.S.A., Hyde Park Art Center, Chicago, IL, June 20 – October 3
 2011 roger brown: urban traumas and natural disasters, Springfield Art Museum, Springfield, MO, September 17 - November 13
 2009 Roger Brown: Early Work, Major Paintings and Constructions, 1968–1980, Russell Bowman Art Advisory, Chicago, IL, March 27 – May 16
 2009 Roger Brown, Art Works: Chicago A Progressive Corporate Exhibition of Chicago Artists, Metropolitan Capital Bank, Chicago, IL	
 2008 Roger Brown: The American Landscape, DC Moore Gallery, New York, NY, May 1 – June 13
 2007–2008 Roger Brown: Southern Exposure, curated by Sidney Lawrence, The Jule Collins Smith Museum of Fine Art at Auburn University, AL, October 6, 2007 – January 5, 2008. Traveled to: The Katzen Arts Center, College of Arts and Sciences, American University, Washington, DC, February 5 - March 22, 2008; The Ogden Museum of Southern Art, University of New Orleans, LA, April 19 – July 31, 2008
 2006 Roger Brown: The Last Paintings, Russell Bowman Art Advisory, Chicago, IL, April 21 – June 17
 2005 Roger Brown: From the Collection of the School of the Art Institute of Chicago, Federal Reserve Board, Washington, DC, February 1 – April 15
 2004–2005 Roger Brown Paintings, Adam Baumgold Gallery, New York, NY, December 3, 2004 – January 15	
 2004 Roger Brown: A Different Dimension, Montgomery Museum of Fine Arts, AL, April 10 – June 6. Traveled to: Chicago Cultural Center, IL, July 17 – September 26
 2004 Roger Brown: Selections from the Collection of the School of the Art Institute of Chicago, Brauer Museum of Art, Valparaiso University, IN, October 15 – December 26
 2003 Roger Brown, Chicago Imagist: Selected Works from the Roger Brown Study Collection of the School of the Art Institute of Chicago, Midwest Museum of American Art, Elkhart, IN, April – June 1
 2001 Roger Brown: Great Lakes Selections from the Collection of the School of the Art Institute of Chicago, Brauer Museum of Art, Valparaiso University, Valparaiso, IN
 2001 Recollections and Observations: The Prints of Roger Brown, Joel and Carole Bernstein Gallery, Smart Museum of Art, University of Chicago, IL, July 14 – September 2
 1999 Roger Brown Paintings from the SAIC Collection, The University Club of Chicago, IL
 1997 Roger Brown, Phyllis Kind Gallery, Chicago, IL, September 19
 1996 Roger Brown: California Dreamin, Santa Barbara Contemporary Arts Forum, Santa Barbara, CA
 1996 Roger Brown, Phyllis Kind Gallery, Chicago, IL, February 2 - March 5
 1995 Roger Brown, Phyllis Kind Gallery, New York City, NY, April 1 - May 6
 1994 Roger Brown, Phyllis Kind Gallery, Chicago, IL, April 8 - May 6
 1992 Roger Brown, Phyllis Kind Gallery, New York City, NY, March 28 - April 28
 1991 Roger Brown: New Paintings, Dean Jensen Gallery, Milwaukee, WI, January 25 - March 9
 1991 Roger Brown, Phyllis Kind Gallery, Chicago, IL, April 12 - May 7
 1991 Who is Roger Brown?: A Tribute to Roger Brown Performance Series, Lewis Cooper Jr. Memorial Library and Arts Center, The Opelika Arts Association, Opelika, AL, October 18 - November 8
 1990 Roger Brown: Recent Work, David Heath Gallery, Atlanta, GA, March 7 - April 20
 1990 "Roger Brown", Arthur Roger Gallery, New Orleans, LA, November 3–24
 1990 Roger Brown, John Berggruen Gallery, San Francisco, CA
 1989 Roger Brown: Recent Painting, Phyllis Kind Gallery, New York City, NY, September 16 - October 11
 1989 Roger Brown, Hege Library, Guilford College, Greensboro, NC
 1988 Roger Brown, Asher/Faure Gallery, Los Angeles, CA, January 16 - February 13
 1988 Roger Brown and Published Works, Lowe Art Museum, Coral Gables, FL, February 10 - March 27
 1988 Roger Brown, Phyllis Kind Gallery, Chicago, IL, April 1 - May 3
 1988 Roger Brown, Arthur Roger Gallery, New Orleans, LA
 1988 Roger Brown, Des Moines Art Center, IA, April 28
 1987–88 Roger Brown: A Retrospective, Hirshhorn Museum and Sculpture Garden, Washington, D.C., August 12 - October 18. Traveled to: La Jolla Museum of Contemporary Art, La Jolla, CA, November 20, 1987 - January 10, 1988; Lowe Art Museum, University of Miami, Coral Gables, FL, February 11 - March 27; Des Moines Art Center, Des Moines, IA, April 28 - June 12, 1988
 1987 Roger Brown, Fendrick Gallery, Washington, D.C., September 10 - October 10
 1987 Roger Brown, Phyllis Kind Gallery, New York, NY, September 10 - October 10
 1987 Roger Brown, Phyllis Kind Gallery and George Braziller, Inc, New York, NY
 1986–87 Roger Brown: Recent Paintings, John Berggruen Gallery, San Francisco, CA, November 25, 1986 - January 3, 1987
 1986 Roger Brown, Phyllis Kind Gallery, Chicago, IL
 1985 Roger Brown, Texas Gallery, Houston, TX, June 18 - July 10
 1985 Roger Brown, Phyllis Kind Gallery, New York City, NY, September 14
 1984 Roger Brown: A Selected Retrospective, Nexus Gallery, Atlanta, GA, May 3 - June 10. Traveled to: University of Florida, Tampa, FL, August 3 - September 15; North Carolina Museum of Art, Raleigh, NC, September 29 - December 2
 1984 Roger Brown, Phyllis Kind Gallery, New York City, NY
 1983 Roger Brown, Asher/Faure Gallery, Los Angeles, CA, September 17 - October 16
 1983 Roger Brown, Scottish National Gallery of Modern Art, Edinburgh, United Kingdom
 1982 Roger Brown, Phyllis Kind Gallery, New York City, NY, September 14
 1981 Roger Brown, Phyllis Kind Gallery, New York City, NY, April 14
 1981 Roger Brown: Recent Paintings, Mayor Gallery, London, England, November 24 - December 18
 1981 Roger Brown Retrospective, Museum of Contemporary Art, Chicago, IL, February 14 - April 12
 1981 Roger Brown, Muzeum Narodowym, Warsaw, Poland
 1980–1981 Roger Brown, Montgomery Museum of Fine Art, Montgomery, AL, October 5 - November 23. Traveled to: Contemporary Arts Museum Houston, Houston, TX, December 12, 1980 - January 19, 1981; Museum of Contemporary Art, Chicago, IL, April 13 - May 12
 1980 Currents 6: Roger Brown, Saint Louis Art Museum, St. Louis, MO, March 25 - May 11. Traveled as "Roger Brown. Matrix/Berkeley 35" to: University Art Museum, University of California, Berkeley, CA, May 28 - July 27.
 1979 Roger Brown, Phyllis Kind Gallery, Chicago, IL, March 2 - April 4
 1979 Roger Brown, Phyllis Kind Gallery, New York City, NY, September 18 - October 27
 1977 Roger Brown, Phyllis Kind Gallery, New York City, NY, September 20 - October 15
 1977 Roger Brown, Phyllis Kind Gallery, Chicago, IL, February 4 - March 9
 1976 Roger Brown, Phyllis Kind Gallery, Chicago, IL, March 10–24
 1975 Roger Brown, Phyllis Kind Gallery, New York City, NY, October 3–25
 1975 Roger Brown, Phyllis Kind Gallery, Chicago, IL, January 10 - February
 1974 Roger Brown, Galerie Darthea Speyer, Paris, France, September 26 - October 31
 1973 Roger Brown, Phyllis Kind Gallery, Chicago, IL, January 5 - February
 1971 Roger Brown, Phyllis Kind Gallery, Chicago, IL, March 17 - April 12

Group exhibitions
 2012–2014 Serious Fun, Honolulu Museum of Art, Honolulu, HI, December 6, 2012 - February 16, 2014
 2012–2013 10th Anniversary Show, Russell Bowman Art Advisory, Chicago, IL, November 2, 2012 - January 26, 2013
 2012 First 50, Museum of Contemporary Art, Chicago, IL, May 12 - August 19
 2012 Skyscraper: Art and Architecture Against Gravity, Museum of Contemporary Art, Chicago, IL, June 30 - September 23
 2012 Afterimage, DePaul Art Museum, Chicago, IL, September 14 - November 15
 2012 American Prints III, Russell Bowman Art Advisory, Chicago, IL, July 7 - August 18
 2012 Beasts of Revelation, DC Moore Gallery, New York, NY June 21 - August 3
 2012 Image/Abstraction/Object, Russell Bowman Art Advisory, Chicago, IL, April 27 - June 30
 2011–2014 U.S. Embassy, office of Ambassador Matthew Bryza, Baku, Azerbaijan
 2011–2012 The Art of Collecting, The Flint Institute of Arts, Flint, MI, November 25, 2011 - January 8, 2012
 2011–2012 Made in Chicago: The Koffler Collection, Smithsonian American Art Museum, Washington, D.C., August 12, 2011 - January 2, 2012
 2011–2012 Chicago Imagists at the Madison Museum of Contemporary Art, Madison Museum of Contemporary Art, Madison, WI, September 11, 2011 - January 15, 2012
 2011 Painting on the Move: Chicago Imagists 1966-1973, Thomas Dane Gallery, London, October 11 - November 26
 2011 Clap, Hessel Museum of Art, Bard College, Annandale-on-Hudson, NY, March 27 - May 22
 2011 American Prints II, Russell Bowman Art Advisory, Chicago, IL, June 24 - August 20
 2011 Great Impressions III, Dean Jensen Gallery, Milwaukee, WI, October 21 - December 3
 2010–2012: Go Figure! and Extreme Makeover: A Fresh Look at the Cantor's Contemporary Collection, Iris and B. Gerald Cantor Center for Visual Arts, Stanford University, Stanford, CA, September 1, 2010 - August 5, 2012
 2010–2011 Figures in Chicago Imagism, Krannert Art Museum, University of Illinois Urbana-Champaign, Urbana, IL,  August 26, 2010 - January 29, 2011
 2010–2011 Touch And Go: Ray Yoshida and his Spheres of Influence, SAIC Sullivan Galleries, Chicago, IL, November 12, 2010 - February 12, 2011
 2010 Chicago Imagism(s), Natalie and James Thompson Art Gallery, San Jose State University, San Jose, CA, November 16 - December 17
 2010 American Prints, Russell Bowman Art Advisory, Chicago, IL, January 8 - March 20
 2010 Chicago Stories: Prints and H.C. Westermann, Art Institute of Chicago, Chicago, IL, May 16 - August 15
 2010 Chicago! Chicago!, Russell Bowman Art Advisory, Chicago, IL, November 5 - December 31
 2009 Trees, DC Moore Gallery, New York City, NY, June 11 - August 7
 2009 INTENSE, Russell Bowman Art Advisory, Chicago, IL, September 11 - October 31
 2009 Isn't It Great To Be An Artist? Insider/Outsider Art from the Robert A. Lewis Collection, Cincinnati Art Museum, Cincinnati, OH, January 31 - April 26
 2009 Great Impressions II, Dean Jensen Gallery, Milwaukee, WI, May 15 - July 11
 2009 The Francis and June Spiezer Collection, Rockford Art Museum, Rockford, IL, July 17 - September 27
 2008–2009 Bearden to Ruscha: Contemporary Art from the North Carolina Museum of Art, Cameron Art Museum, Wilmington, NC, May 22, 2008 - May 24, 2009
 2008 ReSource, Cressman Center for Visual Arts Gallery, University of Louisville, Louisville, KY, January 18 - February 16
 2008 Evening Light, DC Moore Gallery, New York City, NY, September 4–27
 2008 Twenty Years (and Still Counting): Highlights from Two Decades of Exhibitions, Dean Jensen Gallery, Milwaukee, WI, January 18 - March 1
 2008 Chicago Imagism: 1965–1985, Russell Bowman Art Advisory, Chicago, IL, May 16 - August 16
 2008 Everything's Here, Museum of Contemporary Art, Chicago, IL, June 14 - October 26
 2008 Open Air, DC Moore Gallery, New York, NY, June 25 - August 15
 2007–2008 Hairy Who (and some others), Madison Museum of Contemporary Art, Madison, WI, October 14, 2007 - January 8, 2008
 2007 Dreamland: American Explorations Into Surrealism, Sullivan Goss: An American Gallery, Santa Barbara, CA, January 17 - March 25
 2007 Masterworks of Chicago Imagism, Russell Bowman Art Advisory, Chicago, IL, February 23 - April 7
 2007 This Place is Ours! Recent Acquisitions at the Pennsylvania Academy, Pennsylvania Academy of the Fine Arts, Philadelphia, PA, July 7 - September 23
 2006 FULL FRONTAL: the Dirty, Lewd, Erotic Show, Corbett vs Dempsey Gallery, Chicago, IL, July 14 - August 29
 2006 Creatures of the Sea and Sky, Ball State University Museum of Art, Munice, IN, May 19 - November 5
 2005 Jesse Howard & Roger Brown -> Now Read On, H&R Block Artspace, Kansas Art Institute, Kansas City, MO, August 6 - September 17. Traveled to Betty Rymer Gallery, The School of the Art Institute of Chicago, Chicago, IL, October 14 - November 18
 2005 Gallery Selections, Russell Bowman Art Advisory, Chicago, IL, February 4 - March 12
 2005 Four Chicago Imagists: Early Work, 1966–1976, Russell Bowman Art Advisory, Chicago, IL, March 18 - April 23
 2004–2005 The Chicago Imagists, Ball State University Museum of Art, Muncie, IN, December 17, 2004 - March 26, 2005
 2004 That 70s Show: the Age of Pluralism in Chicago, Northern Indiana Arts Association, Munster, IN, June 6 - July 11
 2004 From Folk to Funk: Selections from the Robert A. Lewis Collection, Corcoran Gallery of Art, Washington, D.C., February 21 - April 24
 2004 I Read it for the Art: Chicago, Creativity, and Playboy, Hyde Park Art Center, Chicago, IL, March 7 - April 24
 2003- 2004 Splat Boom Pow! The Influence of Comics in Contemporary Art, Contemporary Arts Museum Houston, Houston, TX, April 12 - June 29, 2003. Traveled to: Institute of Contemporary Art Boston, MA, September 17, 2003 – January 4, 2004; The Wexner Center for the Arts at Ohio State University, Columbus, OH, January 31-May 2, 2004; Henie Onstad Kunstsenter, Hovikodden, Norway, June 17-September 19, 2004
 2002–2008 Jellies: Living Art, Monterey Bay Aquarium, Monterey, CA, April 3, 2002 - September 1, 2008
 2002–2003 Surf Culture: the Art History of Surfing, Laguna Art Museum, Laguna Beach, CA, July 28 - October 6. Traveled to: The Contemporary Museum of Honolulu, Honolulu, HI; The Contemporary Art Center of Virginia, Virginia Beach, VA; San Jose Museum of Art, San Jose, CA
 2002 Art in the 'Toon Age, Kresge Art Museum, Michigan State University, East Lansing, MI, September 3 - November 3
 2002 Made in Chicago ca. 1970, Adam Baumgold Gallery, New York, NY, October 17 - November 30
 2001 Steel and Flesh, Indiana University Northwest INU Gallery for Contemporary Art, Gary, IN
 2001 Roger Brown: Great Lakes Selections from the Collection of The School of the Art Institute of Chicago, Brauer Museum of Art, Valparaiso University, Valparaiso, IN
 2001 SUBLIMATED CONFLICTS: Contentious Categories within the Roger Brown Collection, 1926 Exhibitions Studies Space, Chicago, IL
 2000–2001 Beyond the Mountains: Contemporary American Landscape Painting, New York. Traveled to: Asheville Art Museum, Asheville, NC; Newcomb Art Gallery, Tulane University, New Orleans, LA; Muskegon Museum of Art, Muskegon, MI; Polk Art Museum, Lakeland, FL; Boise Art Museum, Boise, ID; Fort Wayne Museum of Art, Fort Wayne, IN; Lyman Allyn Museum of Art at Connecticut College, New London, CT.
 2000 Bizarro World!, Cornell Fine Arts Museum, Rollins College, Winter Park, FL
 2000 E2K Elvisions 2000, Intuit: The Center for Intuitive and Outsider Art, Chicago, IL, March 8–25
 2000 Jumpin' Backflash: Original Imagist Artwork, 1966-1969, Northern Indiana Arts Association, Munster, IN, January 3 - April 3. Traveled to Chicago Cultural Center, Chicago, IL.
 1998 Roger Brown and Friends in the Nineties, Van Every/Smith Galleries, Davidson College, Davidson, NC, January 3 - March 8. Traveled to the University of Alabama-Birmingham, March 22 - April 17
 1997 30 Hairy: A Celebration of 30 years of Contemporary Art Brought to you by Phyllis Kind, Phyllis Kind Gallery, Chicago, IL
 1997 The Chicago Imagists: Then to Now, Selby Gallery, Ringling School of Art and Design, Sarasota, FL, March 14 - April 12
 1997 Grins: Humor & Whimsy in Contemporary Art, Millard Sheets Center for the Arts, Pomona, CA, September 11–28
 1997 Alabama Roots: A Showcase of Excellence, The Business Center of Alabama, Mobile, AL, February 7 - June 7
 1997 4x4 Painters Choose Painter, Herron Gallery, Herron School of Art and Design, INdianapolis, ID, February 14 - March 21
 1997 A Singular Vision: Prints from Landfall Press, The Museum of Modern Art, New York City, NY, February 6 - May 6
 1997 All Figural: Many Media, Contemporary Art from the Kamm Collection, California State University, Northridge, CA, February 3 - March 8
 1996 Art in Chicago: 1945-1995, Museum of Contemporary Art, Chicago, IL, November 16
 1996 Second Sight: Modern Printmaking in Chicago, Mary & Leigh Block Gallery, Northwestern University, Evanston, IL, September 27 - December 8
 1996 Dealer's Choice: 25 Chicago Dealers Bring Their Art to Indiana, Northern Indiana Arts Association, Munster, IL
 1996 Paintings*Sculpture*Ceramics, Prospectus Art Gallery, Chicago, IL, March 1 - April 26
 1995 Allegorical Landscape, Suburban Fine Arts Center, Highland Park, IL
 1995 Alabama Impact: Contemporary Artists with Alabama Ties, Mobile Museum of Art, Mobile, AL, March 11 - May 7. Traveled to: Huntsville Museum of Art, Huntsville, AL, July 2 - September
 1995 American Art Today: Night Paintings, Florida International University, Miami, FL, January 29 - February 18
 1995 Phyllis Kind Gallery Revisited, The Foster Gallery, University of Wisconsin-Eau Claire, Eau Claire, WI
 1994–1995 Chicago Imagism: A 25 Year Survey, Davenport Museum of Art, Davenport, IA, December 4 - February 12
 1994–1995 The Iceman Cometh: A Fine Arts Look at the Game of Hockey, San Jose Museum of Art, San Jose, CA, December 1 - March 15
 1994–1995 A Passionate Perspective: Francis and June Spiezer Collection of Art, Rockford Art Museum, Rockford, IL, October 28 - January 8
 1994–1997 Elvis + Marilyn: 2X Immortal, The Institute of Contemporary Art, Boston, MA, November 2, 1994 - January 8, 1995. Traveled to: Contemporary Arts Museum Houston, Houston, TX, February 4 - March 26, 1995; Mint Museum, Charlotte, NC, April 15 - June 30, 1995; Cleveland Museum of Art, OH, August 2 - September 24, 1995; The Philbrook Museum of Art, Tulsa, OK, April 13 - June 3, 1996; Columbus Museum of Art, OH, June 22 - August 19, 1996; Tennessee State Museum, Nashville, TN, September 7 - November 3, 1996; San Jose Museum of Art, San Jose, CA, November 23, 1996 - January 30, 1997; Honolulu Academy of Arts, HI, April - June 8, 1997
 1994 The Parkshore Penthouse Apartments presents a Panoramic View of Fine Art from the Phyllis Kind Gallery, The Parkshore Penthouse Apartments, Chicago, IL, January 28
 1994 Thirty Something: A 30th Anniversary Celebration, Fine Arts Museum of the South, Mobile, AL, March 13 - April 17
 1994 Annual Exhibition of Artist Members, The Arts Club of Chicago, Chicago, IL
 1994 Vividly Told: Contemporary Southern Narrative Painting, Morris Museum of Art, Augusta, GA, August 14
 1994 55th Anniversary Exhibition, Hyde Park Art Center, Chicago, IL, April 30-June 11
 1993–1994 Chicago Art Invitational, Union League Club, Chicago, IL
 1993 Imagery: Incongruous Juxtapositions, Phyllis Kind Gallery, Chicago, IL, May 10 - June 14
 1992–1993 Parallel Visions: Modern Artists and Outsider Art, The Los Angeles County Museum of Art, October 18 - December 31. Traveled to Kunsthalle Basel, Switzerland; Centro de Arte Reina Sofia, Madrid, Spain; Setagaya, Art Museum, Tokyo, Japan.
 1992–1993 Mind and Beast: Contemporary Artists and the Animal Kingdom, Leigh Yawkey Woodson Art Museum, Wausau, WI, April - August. Traveled to The Art Museum of South Texas at Corpus Christi, Corpus Christi, TX; The Tucson Museum of Art, Tucson, AZ; The Canton Art Institute, Canton, OH; Fort Wayne Museum of Art, Fort Wayne, IN.
 1992 The Chicago Imagists: Art With An Edge, Lands End Gallery, Dodgeville, WI
 1992 Face to Face: Self Portraits by Chicago Artists, The Chicago Cultural Center, Chicago, IL, February 23 - April 11
 1992 500 Years Since Columbus, Triton Museum of Art, Santa Clara, CA, January 24 - March 9
 1992 My Father's House Has Many Mansions, Phyllis Kind Gallery, New York City, NY
 1992 From America's Studio: Twelve Contemporary Masters, The Art Institute, Chicago, IL, May 10 - June 14
 1992 Group Show, Arthur Roger Gallery, New Orleans, LA
 1992 From America's Studio: Twelve Contemporary Masters, The Art Institute, Chicago, IL, May 10 - June 14
 1991–1994 The Realm of the Coin, Emily Lowe Gallery, Hofstra University, Hempstead, NY, November - December 13. Traveled to Laguna Gloria Art Museum, Austin, TX; Fullerton Museum Center, Fullerton, CA; Hyde Collection, Glens Falls, NY; Harold Washington Library Center, Chicago, IL; Salina Art Center, Salina, KS; Columbia Museum of Art, Columbia, SC.
 1991–1993 Spirited Visions: Portraits of Chicago Artist by Patty Carroll, The State of Illinois Art Gallery, Chicago, IL, September 20 - November 1
 1991 Group Exhibition, Landfall Press, Chicago, IL
 1991 Revelations: Artists Look at Religions, The School of the Art Institute Chicago, Gallery 2, Chicago, IL, September 6 - October 4
 1991 The Art of Advocacy, The Aldrich Contemporary Art Museum, Ridgefield, CT
 1991 Vital Signs: Art in and About Atlanta, The New Nexus Gallery, Nexus Contemporary Art Center (changed to the Atlanta Contemporary Art Center in 2000), Atlanta, GA
 1991 Image and Likeness: Figurative Works from the Permanent Collection of the Whitney Museum of American Art, Whitney Museum of American Art, New York, NY, January 23 - March 20. Traveled to: Whitney Museum of American Art Fairfield County, Stamford, CT, March 29 - June 5
 1990–1991 Word as Image/American Art 1960-1990, Milwaukee Art Museum, Milkwaukee, WI. Traveled to: Oklahoma City Art Museum, Oklahoma City, OK; Contemporary Arts Museum Houston, Houston, TX, February 21 - May 12
 1990–1991 Portraits of a Kind, Phyllis Kind Gallery, Chicago, IL
 1990–1991 Speaking Out: Five Centuries of Social Commentary in Printmaking, Telfair Academy of Arts and Sciences, Savannah, GA, December 19, 1990 – February 17, 1991
 1990 Home Again: The Return of Six Artists Native to the Chattahoochee Valley, Columbus Museum of Art, Columbus, GA
 1990 Art Against AIDS/Chicago, The Chicago International Art Exposition, Navy Pier, Chicago, IL, May 12
 1990 Realism, Modernism, Mysticism: Directions in 20th Century American Art, Valparaiso University Museum of Art, Valparaiso, IN, January 14-February 20
 1989–1992 A Different War Vietnam in Art, Whatcom Museum of History and Art, Bellingham, WA, August 19 - November 12. Traveled to: De Cordova Museum and Sculpture Park, Lincoln, MA, February 17-April 15; Mary and Leigh Block Gallery, Northwestern University, Evanston, IL, May 9-June 24; Akron Art Museum, Akron, OH, September 8-November 4; Madison Art Center, Madison, WI, December 1-January 27; Wight Art Gallery, UCLA, Los Angeles, CA, March 24-May 19; Cu Art Galleries, University of Colorado, Boulder, CO, August 30-October 5; Museum of Art, Washington State University, Pullman, WA, January 13-February 23.
 1989–1990 Rain of Talent: Umbrella Art, Fabric Workshop, Philadelphia, PA. Traveled to the American Craft Museum, New York City, NY; Gallery 400, Chicago, IL.
 1989–1990 Death, State of Illinois Art Gallery, Chicago, IL, March 19-May 11
 1989–1990 A Certain Slant of Light: The Contemporary American Landscape, The Dayton Art Institute, Dayton, OH
 1989–1990 An Eclectic Eye: Selections from the Frederick R. Weisman, joint exhibition at Bridge Center for Contemporary Arts, El Paso, TX and New Mexico State University Gallery, Las Cruces, NM, November 11-December 14. Traveled to: Cheney Cowles Art Museum, Spokane, WS, January 6-February 12; Boise Art Museum, Boise, ID, April 15-June 11; University of Wyoming Art Museum, Laramie, WY, August 25-October 22; New Virginia Beach Center for the Arts, Virginia Beach, VA, November 13-January 28; Gibbes Art Gallery, Charleston, SC, March 9-May 4.
 1989 The Alabama Artists Reunion, Alabama Artists Gallery, Montgomery, AL
 1989 The Road Show: The Automobile in Contemporary Art, John Michael Kohler Arts Center, Sheboygan, WI
 1989 178th Annual Exhibition: Chicago, Maier Museum of Art, Randolph-Macon Woman's College, Lynchburg, VA
 1989 Recent Prints from the Landfall Press, McNay Art Museum of San Antonio Art institute; San Antonio, TX, January 9-February 17
 1989 Chicago Painters in Print: Brown, Paschke, Hull, Lostutter, Pasin-Sloan, Bramson, Wirsum, Landfall Press, Chicago, IL
 1989 Serious Fun, Helander Gallery, Palm Beach, FL, April 13-May 10
 1989 Made in America, Virginia Beach Art Center, Charlotte, NC, April 5-June 11
 1989 CADA AAA/C (The Chicago Art Dealer Association: AIDS Art Auction/Chicago), Museum of Contemporary Art, Chicago, IL, January 24–26
 1988 Contemporary Landscape: Roger Brown, Louisa Chase, David Deutsch, Ellen Galen, and Robert Lawrance Lobe, Rathbone Gallery, Junior College of Albany, Albany, NY
 1988 An Awareness of Place, Richard Green Gallery, New York, NY
 1988 Imprinatur, Greenville County Museum, Greenville County, SC
 1988 Columnar, The Hudson River Museum, Yonkers, NY, July 17-October 16
 1988 1988: The World of Art Today, The Milwaukee Art Museum, Milwaukee, WI
 1988 Selections From the Frederick R. Weisman Collection, Norton Gallery and School of Art, West Palm Beach, FL. Traveled to:  Colorado Springs Fine Arts Center, CO; The New Orleans Museum of Art, Los Angeles, CA
 1988 National Art Against AIDS, Asher/Faure, Los Angeles, CA
 1987–1988 Comic Iconoclasm, Institute of Contemporary Art, London, United Kingdom
 1987 The Chicago Imagist Print, joint exhibition: The David and Alfred Smart Gallery, The University of Chicago, Hyde Park Art Center, The Renaissance Center, Chicago, IL, October 4-December 6
 1987 Gone Fishing, Summer Edition, Graham Modern, New York, NY
 1987 Utopian Visions, Museum of Modern Art, Advisory Services for American Express Company, New York, NY
 1987 Of New Account: The Chicago Imagists, School of Art Gallery, Bowling Green University, Bowling Green, OH
 1987 Surfaces: Two Decades of Painting in Chicago Seventies & Eighties, Terra Museum of American Art, Chicago, IL
 1987 Contemporary American Stage Design, Milwaukee Art Museum, Milwaukee, WI
 1987 The Call of the Wild: Animal Themes in Contemporary Art, Museum of Art, Rhode Island School of Design, Providence, RI, January 16-March 1
 1987 Tragic and Timeless Today: Contemporary History Paintings, Gallery 400, The University of Illinois at Chicago, College of Architecture, Art, and Urban Planning, Chicago, IL, February 4-March 14
 1987 The Contemporary Landscape: Reflections of Social Change, New Jersey Center for Visual Arts, Summit, NJ
 1987 Urgent Messages, Chicago Public Library Cultural Center, Chicago, IL, October 17-December 30
 1987 Symbolic Narrative, Beaver College Art Gallery, Glenside, PA, March 4–25
 1987 Art Against AIDS, 72 New York Galleries, June 1-July 1
 1986–1990 "Focus on Image: Selections from the Rivendell Collection", Phoenix Arts Museum, October 5, 1986 - February 7, 1987. Traveled to: Museum of Art, University of Oklahoma, Norman, OK; Munson Williams Proctor Institute, Utica, NY; University of South Florida Galleries, Tampa, FL; Lakeview Museum of Arts and Sciences, Lakeview, IL; University Art Museum, California State University, Long Beach, CA; Laguna Gloria Art Museum, Austin, TX.
 1986 Second Sight: Biennial IV, San Francisco Museum of Modern Art, San Francisco, CA, September 21 - November 16
 1986 Seventy-Fifth American Exhibition, The Art Institute of Chicago, Chicago, IL, March 8 - April 27
 1986 Figure as Subject: The Last Decade, Whitney Museum of American Art at Equitable Center, New York City, NY, February 13 - June 4
 1986 Golden Anniversary Exhibition, Butler Institute of American Art, Youngstown, OH
 1986 Contemporary Issues III: Selections from the Collection of Robert and Nancy Kaye, Holman Hall, Trenton State College, Trenton, NJ
 1986 10 x 3: Recent work by Roger Brown, William Kohn, and Joan Levinson, Mitchell Museum, Mt. Vernon, IL
 1986 City Streets, Robert Schoelknopf Gallery, New York City, NY, May 21
 1986 New York City: New Work, Delaware Art Museum, Wilmington, DE
 1986 Intersections: Artists View the City, Laguna Gloria Art Museum, Austin, TX
 1986 Chicago International Art Exposition, Navy Pier, Chicago, IL, May 8–13
 1986 Intimate/intimate, Turman Gallery, Indiana State University, Terre Haute, IN, March 22 - April 22
 1985–1986 Correspondences: New York Art Now, Laforet Museum, Tokyo, Japan, December 20, 1985 - January 19, 1986. Traveled to: Tochigi Prefectural Museum of Fine Art, Tochigi, Japan; Tasaki Hall, Espace Media, Kobe, Japan.
 1985–1986 The 39th Biennial Exhibition of Contemporary American Painting, Corcoran Gallery of Art, Washington, D.C.
 1985 Sources of Light: Contemporary American Luminism, Henry Art Gallery, University of Washington, Seattle
 1985 States of War: New European and American Painting, Seattle Art Museum, Seattle, WA
 1985 Art for Greenville: Toward a Southern Collection, Greenville County Museum of Art, Greenville, NC
 1985 Anniversary Show, The Atchison Gallery, Birmingham, AL
 1985 The Political Landscape, Robeson Center Gallery, Rutgers University, Newark, NJ
 1985 Points of View: Four Painters/Gary Bower, Roger Brown, Grace Hartigan, Judy Rifka, Independent Curators, Inc., New York City, NY. Traveled to: Bass Museum of Art, Miami Beach, FL, May 7 - June 16; Lehman College Art Gallery, City University of New York, Bronx, NY, September 17 - October 27; Cleveland Center for Contemporary Art, Cleveland, OH, January 17 - February 15.
 1985 Sights for Small Eyes, Heckscher Museum, Huntington, Long Island, NY, April 28 - June 16
 1985 Blount Invitational Exhibition, Blount, Inc., Montgomery, AL
 1984–1985 Paradise Lost/Paradise Regained: American Visions of the New Decade, American Pavilion, Venice Biennale, June 10 - September 9.  Traveled to: various European locations.
 1984–1985 Contemporary Focus: 1974 through 1984, Hirshhorn Museum and Sculpture Garden, Washington, D.C.
 1984–1985 New Narrative Paintings from the Metropolitan Museum of Art, Museo Rufino Tamayo, Tamayo, Mexico, November 6-January 3
 1984 An International Survey of Recent Painting and Sculpture, Museum of Modern Art, New York, New York, May 17 - August 7
 1984 American Art Now: Painting in the 1980s, Columbus Museum of Arts and Sciences, Columbus, GA
 1984 Ten Years of Contemporary Art, General Electric and Company, Fairfield, CT
 1984 Art in the 80s: Post Avant-Garde, Johnson Gallery, Middlebury College, Middlebury, VT
 1984 Ten Years of Collecting at the MCA, Museum of Contemporary Art, Chicago, IL
 1984 New Narrative Painting in the Collection of the Metropolitan Museum of Art, Museum of Art, Fort Lauderdale, FL
 1984 Selections: Art Since 1945, Freeport McMoran Inc., New York, New York
 1984 The Elements: Weather in Art, Tweed Gallery, Plainfield, NJ
 1984 New Narrative Painting, Berkshire Museum, Pittsfield, MA. Traveled to: Skidmore College Gallery, Sarasota Springs, NY; Rhode Island School of Design, Providence, RI.
 1984 Auto and Culture, Museum of Contemporary Art, Los Angeles, CA. Traveled to Detroit Institute of Arts, Detroit, MI.
 1984 Joseph Yoakum: His Influence on Contemporary Art and Artists, Carl Hammer Gallery, Chicago, IL
 1984 Chicago Cross Section, Trisolini Gallery, University of Ohio at Athens, Athens, OH, May 7 - June 8
 1984 Newscapes, One Penn Plaza, New York, NY
 1984 The Museum of Contemporary Art Selects: Paintings and Sculptures from Chicago's Best, Museum of Contemporary Art, Chicago, IL
 1984 Alternative Spaces: A History in Chicago, Museum of Contemporary Art, Chicago, IL, June 23 - August 19
 1984 Words = Pictures, Bronx Museum of Arts, New York, NY
 1984 Body Politic, Tower Gallery, New York, NY
 1984 Aspects of New Narrative Art, The Berkshire Museum, Pittsfield, MA, August 4 - September 23
 1984 Frederick Weisman Foundation Collection of Contemporary Art, Palm Springs Desert Museum, Palm Springs, CA, January 6
 1984 American Landscape Painting, Fine Arts Gallery, California State University, Los Angeles, CA, October 1 - November 1
 1984 Autoscape: The Automobile in the American Landscape, Whitney Museum of American Art, New York City, NY, March 30 - May 30
 1983–1984 Contemporary American Painting: A Tribute to James & Mari Michener, Archer M. Huntington Gallery, University of Texas at Austin, Austin, TX
 1983–1984 A Painting Show/Selections from a Private Collection, Freedman Gallery, Albright College, Reading, PA
 1983–1984 The End of the World: Contemporary Visions of the Apocalypse, New Museum of Contemporary Art, New York, NY, December 10 - January 22
 1983–1984 Brave New Works: Recent American Painting and Drawing, Museum of Fine Arts, Boston, MA
 1983 200 Years of American Painting from Private Chicago Collections, Terra Museum of American Art, Evanston, IL
 1983 Nocturnes, Siegal Gallery of Contemporary Art, New York City, NY
 1983 Contemporary Light, Kathryn Markel Gallery, New York City, NY
 1983 Contemporary Landscape Painting, Freedman Gallery, Albright College, Reading, PA, through August 6. Traveled to: Zilkha Gallery, Wesleyan University, Middletown, CT; Berkshire Museum, Pittsfield, MA.
 1983 Ten New Narrative Paintings, Metropolitan Museum of Art, New York City, NY
 1983 The Last Laugh, Southern Ohio Museum and Cultural Center, Portsmith, OH, May 15-July 1
 1983 Bodies and Souls, Artists Choice, Museum at Marisa del Re Gallery, New York City, NY
 1983 Brown, Nutt, Paschke, Rudolf Zwirner Gallery, Cologne, West Germany
 1983 Alternative Approaches to Landscape, Thomas Segal Gallery, Boston, MA
 1983 1984: A Preview, Ronald Feldman Gallery, New York City, NY, January 26 - March 12
 1983 Invitational Exhibition for the Benefit of the Hyde Park Art Center, Hyde Park Art Center, Chicago, IL
 1983 Personifications, Massachusetts College of Art, Boston, MA
 1983 Eight Visions, One Penn Plaza, New York City, NY
 1983 Humor in Art, Thorpe Intermedia Gallery, Sparkill, NY, January 8–22
 1983 Chicago Images, Merwin and Wakely Gallery, Illinois Wesleyan University, Bloomington, IL
 1983 Contemporary Paintings from the Weatherspoon Art Gallery, North Carolina Museum of Art, NC, August 13 - October 23
 1982–1983 From Pong to Pac-Man, De Cordova Museum, Lincoln, MA, November 14 - January 2
 1982 Beast: Animal Imagery in Recent Art, Institute for Art and Urban Resources at P.S. 1, Long Island, NY, October 17-December 12
 1982 Chicago Imagists, Charlotte Crispy Kemper Gallery, Kansas City Art Institute, Kansas City, MO. Traveled to: Saginaw Art Museum, Saginaw, MI.
 1982 Contemporary Prints: the Figure Beside Itself, University of Massachusetts, Amherst, MA
 1982 Recent Directions, Milwaukee Art Museum, Milwaukee, WI
 1982 The Atomic Salon, Ronald Feldman Gallery, New York City, NY, June 9 - July 2
 1982 Painting and Sculpture Today: 1982, Indianapolis Museum of Art, Indianapolis, IN, July 6 - August 15
 1982 Chicago on Paper, Ray Hughes Gallery, Brisbane, Australia
 1982 Selections from the Dennis Adrian Collection, Museum of Contemporary Art, Chicago, IL
 1982 Annual Midyear Show, Butler Institute of American Art, Youngstown, OH
 1982 From Chicago, Pace Gallery, New York City, NY, January 15 - February 13
 1981–1983 Prints and Multiples: 79th Exhibition by Artists in Chicago and the Vicinity, School of the Art Institute, Chicago, IL, July 4 - August 16, 1981. Traveled to: Lakeview Museum, Peoria, IL, October 4 - November 15, 1981; National Academy of Design, New York, NY, January 19 - February 21, 1982; Smithsonian Institution, Washington, D.C., May 19 - August 21, 1982; Illinois State Museum, Springfield, IL, September 12–23, 1982; Quincy Society of Fine Arts and Quincy Arts Club, Quincy, IL, December 13, 1982 - January 23, 1983; University Museum of Southern Illinois, Carbondale, IL, February - March 1983; Portland Art Museum, Portland, OR, May - June 1983.
 1981 American Painting 1930–1980, Haus der Kunst, Munich, Germany
 1981 Contemporary Artists, Cleveland Museum of Art, Cleveland, OH, October 21 - November 29
 1981 American Landscape: Recent Developments, Whitney Museum of American Art, Fairfield County, Stamford, CT, October 23 - December 9
 1981 Inner/Urban, multiple locations: The Ohio Federation of the Arts, and First Street Gallery, St. Louis, MO
 1981 Religion into Art, Pratt Manhattan Center, New York City, NY
 1981 A Penthouse Aviary, multiple locations: Dancer, Fitzgerald, and Sample, Inc., New York City, NY
 1980–1981 The Changing Canvas, Cranbrook Academy of Art Museum, Cranbrook, MI, September 14 - October 26. Traveled to on Michigan Artrain: Albion, MI, April 5–11; Tecmseh, MI, April 16–21; Fenton, MI, April 26 - May 1; Bangor, MI May 14–19; Grandville, MI, May 14–19; Reed City, MI, May 23–28; Alpena, MI, June 3–8; Boyne City, MI, June 12–16; Ludington, June 20–25; Norton Shores, MI, June 29-July 6; Detroit, MI, July 12–20; Mackinaw City, MI, July 25–29.
 1980 Six Artists From Chicago, Mayor Gallery, London, England
 1980 The Figurative Tradition and the Whitney Museum of American Art, Whitney Museum of American Art, New York City, NY
 1980 Some Recent Art from Chicago, Ackland Museum of Art, University of North Carolina, Chapel Hill, NC
 1980 Whitney Halstead Memorial Exhibition, The School of the Art Institute of Chicago, Chicago, IL, October 3–31. Traveled to: Rockford College, Rockford, IL, November 6–23
 1980 Image Into Pattern: Paintings by Roger Brown, Robert Gordy, and John Tweddle, multiple locations: The Institute for Art & Urban Resources; INC.; P.S. 1, April 27 - June 15.
 1979–81 The Nineteen Seventies: New American Painting, International Communications Agency. Traveled to: Eastern European cities
 1979 Collaborations and Amplifications, Salt Lake Center, Salt Lake City, UT
 1979 Biennial, Whitney Museum of American Art, New York City, NY
 1979 Art Inc.: American Painting from Corporate Collections, Montgomery Museum of Fine Art, AL, January. Traveled to: Corcoran Gallery of Art, Washington, D.C.; Indianapolis Museum of Art, Indianapolis, IN; San Diego Museum of Art, San Diego, CA.
 1979 Intricate Structure/Repeated Image, Tyler School of Art, Temple University, Elkins Park, PA
 1979 Uncommon Visions, Memorial Art Gallery, University of Rochester, Rochester, NY, May 4 - June 24
 1979 Chicago Currents/The Kokffler Foundation, National Collection of Fine Arts, Washington, D.C.
 1979 Annual Midyear Show, Butler Institute of American Art, Youngstown, OH
 1978–79 American Painting of the 1970s, Albright-Knox Gallery, Buffalo, NY, December 8 - January 14. Traveled to: Newport Harbor Art Museum, Newport Beach, CA, February 3 - March 18; The Oakland Museum, Oakland, CA, April 10 - May 20; Cincinnati Art Museum, Cincinnati, OH, July 6 - August 26; Art Museum of South Texas, Corpus Christi, TX, September 9 - October 21; Krannert Art Museum, University of Illinois, Champaign, IL, November 11 - January 2.
 1978 Flower Show, Hyde Park Art Center, Chicago, IL, April - May
 1978 Contemporary Chicago Painters, University of Northern Iowa Gallery of Art, Cedar Rapids, IA, April 2 - April 30.
 1978 The Chair and the Contemporary American Artist, John Michael Kohler Arts Center, Sheboygan, WI, April 16 - May 28
 1977–78 The Annual, San Francisco Art Institute, San Francisco, CA, July 23 - August 14
 1977 Masterpieces of Chicago Art, Chicago Public Library Cultural Center, Chicago, IL
 1977 Chicago and Vicinity Show, The Art Institute of Chicago, Chicago, IL
 1977 Improbable Furniture, Institute of Contemporary Art, University of Pennsylvania, Philadelphia, PA, March 16 - April 10. Traveled to: La Jolla Museum of Contemporary Art, La Jolla, CA, May.
 1977 Contemporary Figurative Painting in the Midwest, The Madison Art Center, Madison, WI, February 26 - April 10
 1976–77 The Chicago Connection, E.B. Crocker Art Gallery, Sacramento, CA. Traveled to: Newport Harbor Art Museum, Newport, CA; Phoenix Art Museum, Phoenix, AZ; Brooks Memorial Art Gallery, Memphis, TN; Memorial Art Gallery, University of Rochester, Rochester, NY.
 1976 Former Famous Alumni, The School of the Art Institute of Chicago, Chicago, IL
 1976 Old and New Works by Artists from the Phyllis Kind Gallery, Foster Gallery, University of Wisconsin, Eau Claire, WI
 1976 76th Annual Exhibition by Artists of Chicago and Vicinity, Art Institute of Chicago, Chicago, IL
 1976 Chicago, chic..., Taylor Hall Art Gallery, California State University, Chico, CA, March 22 - April 9
 1975 75th Annual Exhibition by Artists of Chicago and Vicinity, Art Institute of Chicago, Chicago, IL
 1974 Biennial, Whitney Museum of American Art, New York City, NY
 1974 The Chicago Style: Painting, An Exhibition by Contemporary Chicago Artists, Arts on the Midway Program, University of Chicago, January 13 - February 16
 1974 Chicago and Vicinity Show, Art Institute of Chicago, Chicago, IL
 1973–74 XII Bienal de Sao Paulo, São Paulo, Brazil. Traveled to: throughout South America; The National Collection of Fine Arts, Smithsonian Institution, Washington, D.C., October 31 - December 1974; Museum of Contemporary Art, Chicago, IL, January 11 - March 2
 1973 Extraordinary Realities, Whitney Museum of American Art, New York City, NY. Traveled to: Everson Museum, Syracruse, NY; Contemporary Arts Center, Cincinnati, OH.
 1973 Biennial Exhibition: Contemporary American Art, Whitney Museum of American Art, New York, NY, January 10 - March 18
 1972 The Chicago School: Imagist Art 1947–1972, Museum of Contemporary Art, Chicago, IL, May 13 - June 25. Traveled to: Contemporary Arts Museum, Houston, TX
 1972 Chicago Imagist Art, The New York Cultural Center with Fairleigh Dickinson University, New York, NY, July 21 - August 27
 1971 73rd Annual Exhibition by Artists of Chicago and Vicinity, Art Institute of Chicago, Chicago, IL
 1971 Illinois Painters II, Illinois Arts Council, Chicago, IL
 1971 Chicago and Vicinity Show, The Art Institute of Chicago, Chicago, IL
 1970 Surplus Slop form the Windy City, San Francisco Art Institute, San Francisco, CA. Traveled to: Sacramento State College Art Gallery, Sacramento, CA
 1970 Prints by Seven, Whitney Museum of American Art, New York, NY
 1970 Pre-View, Hyde Park Art Center, Chicago, IL
 1969 Spirit of the Comics, Institute of Contemporary Art, University of Pennsylvania, Philadelphia, PA
 1969 Don Baum Sez Chicago Needs Famous Artists, Museum of Contemporary Art, Chicago, IL
 1969 72nd Annual Exhibition by Artists of Chicago, Art Institute of Chicago, Chicago, IL
 1969 Chicago and Vicinity Show, The Art Institute of Chicago, Chicago, IL
 1968–69 The False Image, Hyde Park Art Center, Chicago, IL

Publications
2012 Roger Brown: This Boy's Own Story (exh. cat.), Chicago, IL: School of the Art Institute of Chicago.
2010 Brown, Roger, Nicholas Lowe, Lisa Stone, Christine Atha, and Dana Boutin. Roger Brown: Calif. U.S.A. (exh. cat.), Chicago, IL: School of the Art Institute of Chicago.
2008 Storr, Robert. "The American Landscape," Roger Brown: The American Landscape (exh. cat.), New York, NY: DC Moore Gallery.
2007 Lawrence, Sidney, Lisa Stone, and Lee Gray. Roger Brown: Southern Exposure (exh. cat.), Tuscaloosa, Alabama: The University of Alabama Press.
2005 Howard, Jesse, Roger Brown, Lisa Stone, and Raechell Smith. Jesse Howard and Roger Brown: Now Read On (exh. cat.), Kansas City, MO: UMKC Center for Creative Studies.
2004 Brown, Roger, Dennis Adrian, and Lisa Stone. Roger Brown: A Different Dimension (exh. cat.), Montgomery, Alabama: Montgomery Museum of Fine Arts.
1998 Adrian, Dennis. A Selection of Works on Paper and Other Materials from the Roger Brown Study Collection of The School of the Art Institute of Chicago, Chicago, IL: The School of the Art Institute of Chicago Press.
1998 Nesbit, Perry. Roger Brown and Friends in the Nineties (exh. cat.), Davidson, NC: Van Every/Smith Galleries, Davidson College.
1990 Gedo, Mary Mathews. "An Autobiography in the Shape of Alabama: The Art of Roger Brown." In Postmodern Perspectives: Issues in Contemporary Art, ed. Howard Risatti, Englewood Cliffs, New Jersey: Prentice Hall, pp. 276–89.
1987 Lawrence, Sidney and John Yau. Roger Brown (exh. cat.), New York: George Braziller in association with the Hirshhorn Museum and Sculpture Garden, Smithsonian Institution.
1985 Adrian, Dennis. "Roger Brown and the Chicago Context: An Appreciation," reprinted in Sight Out of Mind: Essays and Criticism on Art, Ann Arbor: UMI Research Press.
1980 Cowart, Jack. Currents 6: Roger Brown (exh. brochure), St. Louis: St. Louis Art Museum. Reprinted in Roger Brown. Matrix/Berkeley 35 (exh. brochure), Berkeley, CA: University Art Museum.
1980 Kahan, Mitchell Douglas with contributions by Dennis Adrian and Russell Bowman. Roger Brown (exh. cat.), Montgomery, Alabama: Montgomery Museum of Fine Arts.
1980 Keefe, Katherine Lee. "A Conversation," Some Recent Art from Chicago (exh. cat.), Chapel Hill, North Carolina: Ackland Art Museum.

Notes

External links 
AbsolutArts
Madison Museum of Contemporary Art
Roger Brown Study Collection
Full biography from The Art Institute of Chicago 
The Roger Brown Memorial Rock House
Google Street View Roger Brown Study Collection, 1926 N. Halstead, Chicago

1941 births
1997 deaths
People from Hamilton, Alabama
People from Opelika, Alabama
20th-century American painters
American male painters
American gay artists
LGBT people from Alabama
School of the Art Institute of Chicago alumni
20th-century American LGBT people
20th-century American male artists